Stephanorrhina princeps, common name spotted flower beetle, is a beetle from the family Scarabaeidae, subfamily Cetoniinae and tribe Goliathini.

Description
It has usually a brilliant metallic green coloration, with bright white spots in the elytra. However the background may vary  from purple to light-green. On the pronotum there are two dark green spots. Males have two small and two large horns (sexual dimorphism). Life cycle  from egg to imago takes about six-eight months, with two-four months in cocoon stage. The adults feed on fruits and flowers. Life expectancy of adults is three-four months.

Distribution
This species is an endemism of Malawi, Dedza.

Subspecies
 Stephanorrhina princeps bamptoni Allard, 1984
 Stephanorrhina princeps princeps (Oberthür, 1880)
 Stephanorrhina princeps pygidiomaculata Schürhoff, 1935

References
Biolib
Flower-beetles

External links
Goliathus
Beetlegate
Beetle-space

Cetoniinae
Beetles described in 1880